Antonio Mazzone (19 December 1934 – 10 December 2022) was an Italian politician. A member of the Italian Social Movement and the National Alliance, he served in the Chamber of Deputies from 1983 to 1989 and 1994 to 1996 and was a member of the European Parliament from 1989 to 1994.

Mazzone died on 10 December 2022, at the age of 87.

References

1934 births
2022 deaths
Italian Social Movement politicians
Italian Social Movement MEPs
MEPs for Italy 1989–1994
Deputies of Legislature IX of Italy
Deputies of Legislature X of Italy
Deputies of Legislature XII of Italy
20th-century Italian lawyers
Politicians from Naples